Valentim Fernandes (died 1518 or 1519) was a printer who lived in Portugal. An ethnic German originally from Moravia, he moved to Lisbon, Portugal in 1495 where he lived and worked for 23 years, he was a writer and a translator of various classical texts. He printed on the orders of Leonor of Viseu and worked on the book Vita Christi.

His 1506-1507 Descripcam described how camel caravans carried Saharan salt from Oualata to Timbuktu, and then onto Djenne.  There the salt was exchanged with the Soninke Wangara for gold.

He died in Lisbon in 1518 or 1519.

He work with different intellectuals and artists, some of them were Albrecht Dürer, Hieronymus Münzer and Mathias Ringmann (better known as Philesius Vogesigena who was a translator), particularly the last geographer who sent to Germany (which was part of the Holy Roman Empire) the news of the Portuguese discoveries.

See also
Valentim Fernandes manuscript (Descripcam)

References

1510s deaths
German expatriates in Portugal
Printers of incunabula
Year of birth unknown

Portuguese people of German descent